Sheldon Powell (born 8 November 1987) is a Jamaican cricketer. He played in one List A match for the Jamaican cricket team in 2007.

See also
 List of Jamaican representative cricketers

References

External links
 

1987 births
Living people
Jamaican cricketers
Jamaica cricketers
Place of birth missing (living people)